Azmatullah Nazeer (born 5 September 1973) is a Pakistani-born cricketer who plays for the Kuwait national cricket team. He played in the 2013 ICC World Cricket League Division Six tournament.

References

External links
 

1973 births
Living people
Kuwaiti cricketers
Pakistani emigrants to Kuwait
Pakistani expatriates in Kuwait
Place of birth missing (living people)